Breaking Home Ties is a 1922 American silent drama film directed by George K. Rolands and Frank N. Seltzer and starring Lee Kohlmar, Rebecca Weintraub and Jane Thomas.

Cast
 Lee Kohlmar as Father Bergman
 Rebecca Weintraub as 	Mother Bergman
 Richard Farrell as David Bergman
 Arthur Ashley as Paul Zeidman
 Betty Howe as Esther
 Jane Thomas as Rose Neuman
 Henry B. Schaffer as J. B. Martin
 Maude Hill as Mrs. Martin
 Robert Maximillian as Moskowitz

References

Bibliography
 Munden, Kenneth White. The American Film Institute Catalog of Motion Pictures Produced in the United States, Part 1. University of California Press, 1997.

External links
 

1922 films
1922 drama films
1920s English-language films
American silent feature films
Silent American drama films
American black-and-white films
Associated Exhibitors films
1920s American films